Ireland participated in the Eurovision Song Contest 2017 with the song "Dying to Try", sung by Brendan Murray and written by Jörgen Elofsson and James Newman. The song and the singer were internally selected in December 2016 by the Irish broadcaster Raidió Teilifís Éireann (RTÉ) to represent the nation at the 2017 contest in Kyiv, Ukraine.

Ireland was drawn to compete in the second semi-final of the Eurovision Song Contest which took place on 11 May 2017. Performing during the show in position 9, "Dying to Try" was not announced among the top 10 entries of the second semi-final and therefore did not qualify to compete in the final. This is the fourth year in a row that Ireland has failed to qualify for the final.

Background

Ireland has won the contest a record seven times in total. The country's first win came in 1970, with then-18-year-old Dana winning with "All Kinds of Everything". Ireland holds the record for being the only country to win the contest three times in a row (in 1992, 1993 and 1994), as well as having the only three-time winner (Johnny Logan, who won in 1980 as a singer, 1987 as a singer-songwriter, and again in 1992 as a songwriter). In 2011 and 2012, Jedward represented the nation for two consecutive years, managing to qualify to the final both times and achieve Ireland's highest position in the contest since 2000, placing eighth in 2011 with the song "Lipstick". However, in 2013, despite managing to qualify to the final, Ryan Dolan and his song "Only Love Survives" placed last in the final. The Irish entries in 2014, "Heartbeat" performed by Can-linn featuring Kasey Smith, in 2015, "Playing with Numbers" performed by Molly Sterling, and in 2016 "Sunlight" performed by Nicky Byrne all failed to qualify to the final.

Before Eurovision

Internal selection
RTÉ confirmed their intentions to participate at the 2017 Eurovision Song Contest on 24 May 2016. On 16 December 2016, Louis Walsh, who was in charge of the selection process, announced during The Late Late Show that he had internally selected Brendan Murray to represent Ireland in Kyiv. Murray was a former member of the Irish boy band HomeTown. During the show, Murray performed a guitar rendition of "Hold Me Now" by Johnny Logan.

Along with the announcement that Murray would represent Ireland on 16 December, RTÉ opened a song submission period where composers were able to submit their entries until 16 January 2017. At the closing of the deadline, 330 songs were received. The song to be performed by Murray was selected by Walsh and a jury panel with members appointed by RTÉ: Linda Martin (Eurovision 1992 winner), Niamh Kavanagh (Eurovision 1993 winner), Michael Kealy (Irish Head of Delegation at the Eurovision Song Contest), Dympna Clerkin (Irish Assistant Head of Delegation at the Eurovision Song Contest), Jim Sheridan (musician) and Patrick Hughes (Sony Music Ireland representative). On 10 March 2017, the song, "Dying to Try", was released and uploaded on YouTube. The song was written by Jörgen Elofsson and James Newman.

At Eurovision 
According to Eurovision rules, all nations with the exceptions of the host country and the "Big Five" (France, Germany, Italy, Spain and the United Kingdom) are required to qualify from one of two semi-finals in order to compete for the final; the top ten countries from each semi-final progress to the final. The European Broadcasting Union (EBU) split up the competing countries into six different pots based on voting patterns from previous contests, with countries with favourable voting histories put into the same pot. On 31 January 2017, a special allocation draw was held which placed each country into one of the two semi-finals, as well as which half of the show they would perform in. Ireland was placed into the second semi-final, held on 11 May 2017, and was scheduled to perform in the first half of the show. The song failed to qualify for the final, placing 13th in Semi Final 2 with 86 points.

Voting
Below is a breakdown of points awarded to Ireland and awarded by Ireland in the second semi-final and grand final of the contest, and the breakdown of the jury voting and televoting conducted during the two shows:

Points awarded to Ireland

Points awarded by Ireland

Detailed voting results
The following members comprised the Irish jury:
 Greg French (jury chairperson)musical director, producer, composer
 Suzanne Doylemusic industry consultant
 Amanda Lanesinger, band manager, musical director
 Dayl Croninsinger, musician
 Louise Macnamaramusician, singer, songwriter

References 

2017
Countries in the Eurovision Song Contest 2017
Eurovision
Eurovision